Concord Grand is a mixed-use building located at 169/1, Shantinagar, Dhaka-1217, Bangladesh. It is constructed by Concord Group. The building has 25 floors, which are used for commercial and residential purposes.

See also
 List of tallest buildings in Bangladesh
 List of tallest buildings in Dhaka

References 

Buildings and structures in Dhaka
Skyscraper office buildings in Bangladesh
Residential skyscrapers
Buildings and structures completed in 2005